Lott as a surname or given name may refer to:

Surname 
 Barbara Lott (1920–2002), British actress
 Bret Lott (born 1958), American author
 Bushrod W. Lott (1826–1886), American politician
 Cara Lott (born 1961), pornographic actress
 Dawn Lott, African-American mathematician
 Elisha Everett Lott (1820–1864), Texas legislator
 Felicity Lott (born 1947), English soprano
 George Lott (1906–1991), American tennis player and coach
 Hank Lott, (born 1974), former Mississippi state Representative
 Henrique Teixeira Lott (1894–1984), Brazilian politician and military officer
 Hiram R. Lott (1829–1895), Louisiana politician
 Jerry Lott (1938–1983), American rockabilly singer
 Jodi Lott (born 1971), Georgia state Representative
 John Lott, various people
 Nic Lott (born 1979), American politician
 Pixie Lott (born 1991), British singer
 Ronnie Lott (born 1959), American National Football League player
 Ryan Lott (born 1979), American musician and founder of the band Son Lux
 Trent Lott (born 1941), former US Representative and US Senator
 Werner Lott (1907–1997), German U-boat commander in World War II

Given name 
 Lott Cary (1780–1828), African-American Baptist minister and lay physician, instrumental in the founding of the Colony of Liberia
 Lott R. Herrick (1871–1937), American jurist
 Lott Warren (1797–1861), United States Representative from Georgia

Fictional characters 
 Ivor Lott, a character from the British comic strip Ivor Lott and Tony Broke

See also 

 Lot (disambiguation)
 Lotti (given name)
 Lotty